Gagea triflora is an Asian  species of plants in the lily family. It is native to Japan, Korea, China (Hebei, Heilongjiang, Jilin, Liaoning, Shanxi), and Russia (Amur Oblast, Primorye, Sakhalin, Kuril Islands, Kamchatka, Khabarovsk).

Gagea triflora is a bulb-forming perennial up to 30 cm tall. Flowers are white with green veins.

References

External links
Nature Library, 三花顶冰花 （Gagea triflora） color photos
На сниках BERENDEY-a, по-видимому, тоже Lloydia triflora (цветки по 2-3, а не одиночные, с зелёными жилками), так что перенёс их сюда.  color photos, captions and description in Russian

triflora
Flora of Asia
Plants described in 1812